Parkview is a suburb of Johannesburg, South Africa. It borders the suburb of Greenside and overlooks Zoo Lake, a park which lies on the opposite side of Jan Smuts Avenue from the Johannesburg Zoo. All of its streets are named after Irish counties. Parkview, established more than a century ago, is one of the oldest suburbs in Johannesburg, and much of its historic architecture remains intact. The Alliance Française in Johannesburg is situated in Parkview.

History
The suburb lies on land on one of the original farms that make up Johannesburg, called Braamfontein. Its name comes from the view of the park that is now called Zoo Lake. All of the streets in Parkview are named after Irish counties. At the time of the establishment of Parkview the Mayor of Johannesburg was Irish.

Education
Schools in the area include Parkview Senior School, Parktown High School for Girls and Jan Celliers Laerskool.The suburb is also known for many of its pre-primary’s. Parkview Pre-Primary being the oldest, established in 1958.

References

Johannesburg Region B